Samuel Loomis (1748–1814) was a Connecticut furniture maker and the most celebrated maker of Colchester/Norwich style furniture.

External links
 "Chest on chest" by Samuel Loomis, 1780–1785, in the collection of the Wadsworth Atheneum
 "Desk"  by Samuel Loomis, about 1770, in the collection of the Wadsworth Atheneum

American cabinetmakers
American furniture designers
People of colonial Connecticut
1748 births
1814 deaths
Businesspeople from Connecticut